Remídio José Bohn (21 May 1950 – 6 January 2018) was a Roman Catholic bishop.

Bohn was ordained to the priesthood in 1975. He served as auxiliary bishop for the Archdiocese of Porto Alegre, Brazil from 2006 to 2011. He then served as bishop of the Diocese of Cachoeira do Sul, Brazil from 2011 until his death.

Notes

1950 births
2018 deaths
21st-century Roman Catholic bishops in Brazil
Roman Catholic bishops of Cachoeira do Sul